The term Yankee and its contracted form Yank have several interrelated meanings, all referring to people from the United States. Its various senses depend on the context, and may refer to New Englanders, residents of the Northern United States, or Americans in general. According to the Oxford English Dictionary, it is "a nickname for a native or inhabitant of New England, or, more widely, of the northern States generally".

Outside the United States, Yank is used informally to refer to an American person or thing. It has been especially popular in the United Kingdom, Ireland, Canada, South Africa, Australia, and New Zealand where it may be used variously with uncomplimentary overtones or cordially. In the Southern United States, Yankee is a derisive term which refers to all Northerners, and during the American Civil War was applied by Confederates to soldiers of the Union army in general. Elsewhere in the United States, it largely refers to people from the Northeastern states, but especially those with New England cultural ties, such as descendants of colonial New England settlers, wherever they live. Its sense is sometimes more cultural than geographical, emphasizing the Calvinist Puritan Christian beliefs and traditions of the Congregationalists who brought their culture when they settled outside New England. The speech dialect of Eastern New England English is called "Yankee" or "Yankee dialect".

Origin and history of the word

Early usage
British General James Wolfe made the earliest recorded use of the word "Yankee" in 1758 when he referred to the New England soldiers under his command. "I can afford you two companies of Yankees, and the more, because they are better for ranging and scouting than either work or vigilance". Later British use of the word was in a derogatory manner, as seen in a cartoon published in 1775 ridiculing "Yankee" (American) soldiers. New Englanders themselves employed the word in a neutral sense; the "Pennamite–Yankee War", for example, was a series of clashes in 1769 over land titles in Pennsylvania between settlers from Connecticut Colony and "Pennamite" settlers from Pennsylvania.

The meaning of Yankee has varied over time. In the 18th century, it referred to residents of New England descended from the original English settlers of the region. Mark Twain used the word in this sense the following century in his 1889 novel A Connecticut Yankee in King Arthur's Court. As early as the 1770s, British people applied the term to any person from the United States. In the 19th century, Americans in the southern United States employed the word in reference to Americans from the northern United States, though not to recent immigrants from Europe. Thus, a visitor to Richmond, Virginia commented in 1818, "The enterprising people are mostly strangers; Scots, Irish, and especially New England men, or Yankees, as they are called".

Historically, it has also been used to distinguish American-born Protestants from later immigrants, such as Catholics of Irish descent.

Rejected etymologies
Many etymologies have been suggested for the word Yankee, but modern linguists generally reject theories that suggest that it originated in any indigenous languages. This includes a theory put forth by a British officer in 1789, who said that it was derived from the Cherokee word eankke ("coward")—despite the fact that no such word existed in the Cherokee language. Another theory surmised that the word was borrowed from the Wyandot pronunciation of the French l'anglais, meaning "the Englishman" or "the English language", which was sounded as Y'an-gee.

American musicologist Oscar Sonneck debunked a romanticized false etymology in his 1909 work Report on "The Star-Spangled Banner", "Hail Columbia", "America", "Yankee Doodle". He cited a popular theory which claimed that the word came from a tribe who called themselves Yankoos, said to mean "invincible". The story claimed that New Englanders had defeated this tribe after a bloody battle, and the remaining Yankoo Indians transferred their name to the victors—who were "agreeable to the Indian custom". Sonneck notes that multiple American writers since 1775 had repeated this story as if it were fact, despite what he perceived to be holes in it. It had never been the tradition of any Indian tribe to transfer their name to other peoples, according to Sonneck, nor had any settlers ever adopted an Indian name to describe themselves. Sonneck concludes by pointing out that there was never a tribe called the Yankoos.

Dutch origin hypothesis 

Most linguists look to Dutch language sources, noting the extensive interaction between the Dutch colonists in New Netherland (now largely New York, New Jersey, Delaware, and western Connecticut) and the English colonists in New England (Massachusetts, Rhode Island, and eastern Connecticut). The exact application, however, is uncertain; some scholars suggest that it was a term used in derision of the Dutch colonists, others that it was derisive of the English colonists.

Michael Quinion and Patrick Hanks argue that the term comes from the Dutch Janneke, a diminutive form of the given name Jan (John) which would be Anglicized by New Englanders as "Yankee" due to the Dutch pronunciation of J being the same as the English Y. Quinion and Hanks posit that it was "used as a nickname for a Dutch-speaking American in colonial times" and could have grown to include non-Dutch colonists, as well. The Oxford English Dictionary calls this theory "perhaps the most plausible". 

Alternatively, two Dutch given names Jan and Kees have long been common, and the two are sometimes combined into a single name (Jan Kees). Its Anglicized spelling Yankee could, in this way, have been used to mock Dutch colonists. The chosen name Jan Kees may have been partly inspired by a dialectal rendition of Jan Kaas ("John Cheese"), the generic nickname that Southern Dutch (particularly Flemish) used for Dutch people living in the North.

The Online Etymology Dictionary gives Yankee its origin as around 1683, attributing it to English colonists insultingly referring to Dutch colonists (especially freebooters). English privateer William Dampier relates his dealings in 1681 with Dutch fellow privateer, Captain Yanky (or Yanke). Linguist Jan de Vries notes that there was mention of a pirate named Dutch Yanky in the 17th century. The Life and Adventures of Sir Launcelot Greaves (1760) contains the passage, "Haul forward thy chair again, take thy berth, and proceed with thy story in a direct course, without yawing like a Dutch yanky."<ref>The Life and Adventures of Sir Launcelot Greaves, Tobias Smollett, chapter 3</ref> According to this theory, Dutch settlers of New Amsterdam started using the term against the English colonists of neighboring Connecticut.

 Historic uses 

Canadian usage
An early use of the term outside the United States was in the creation of Sam Slick the "Yankee Clockmaker" in a newspaper column in Halifax, Nova Scotia in 1835. The character was a plain-speaking American who becomes an example for Nova Scotians to follow in his industry and practicality; and his uncouth manners and vanity were the epitome of qualities that his creator detested. The character was developed by Thomas Chandler Haliburton, and it grew between 1836 and 1844 in a series of publications.

Damn Yankee
The damned Yankee usage dates from 1812. Confederates popularized it as a derogatory term for their Northern enemies during and after the American Civil War (1861–1865). Eventual Rhode Island Governor Bruce Sundlun had been a pilot in World War II, and he named his B-17F bomber Damn Yankee because a crewman from North Carolina nicknamed him with that epithet.

Yankee Doodle

A pervasive influence on the use of the term throughout the years has been the song "Yankee Doodle" which was popular during the American Revolutionary War (1775–1783). The song originated among the British troops during the French and Indian or Seven Years' War, creating a stereotype of the Yankee simpleton who stuck a feather in his cap and thought that he was stylish, but it was rapidly re-appropriated by American patriots after the battles of Lexington and Concord. Today, "Yankee Doodle" is the official state song of Connecticut.

 Cultural history 

The term Yankee now may mean any resident of New England or of any of the Northeastern United States. The original Yankees diffused widely across the northern United States, leaving their imprints in New York, the Upper Midwest, and places as far away as Seattle, San Francisco, and Honolulu. Yankees typically lived in villages consisting of clusters of separate farms.  Often they were merchants, bankers, teachers, or professionals. 

Village life fostered local democracy, best exemplified by the open town meeting form of government that still exists today in New England. Village life also stimulated mutual oversight of moral behavior and emphasized civic virtue. From the New England seaports of Boston, Salem, Providence, and New London, among others, the Yankees built international trade routes, stretching to China by 1800. Much of the profit from trading was reinvested in the textile and machine tools industries. In the book Dawn and the Dons; The Romance of Monterey, Tirey L. Ford, in 1926, talks about Yankees from Boston loading hides in Monterey, California.

Stereotypes
Yankee ingenuity was a worldwide stereotype of inventiveness, technical solutions to practical problems, "know-how," self-reliance, and individual enterprise. The stereotype first appeared in the 19th century. As Mitchell Wilson notes, "Yankee ingenuity and Yankee git-up-and-go did not exist in colonial days." The great majority of Yankees gravitated toward the burgeoning cities of the northeast, while wealthy New Englanders also sent ambassadors to frontier communities where they became influential bankers and newspaper printers. They introduced the term "Universal Yankee Nation" to proselytize their hopes for national and global influence.

Religion
In religion, New England Yankees originally followed the Puritan tradition, as expressed in Congregational churches. Beginning in the late colonial period, many became Presbyterians, Episcopalians, Methodists, Baptists, or, later, Unitarians. Strait-laced 17th-century moralism as derided by novelist Nathaniel Hawthorne faded in the 18th century. The First Great Awakening (under Jonathan Edwards and others) in the mid-18th century and the Second Great Awakening in the early 19th century (under Charles Grandison Finney, among others) emphasized personal piety, revivals, and devotion to civic duty. Theologically, Arminianism replaced the original Calvinism. Horace Bushnell introduced the idea of Christian nurture, through which children would be brought to religion without revivals.

Politics and reform
After 1800, Yankees spearheaded most American reform movements, including those for the abolition of slavery, temperance in use of alcohol, increase in women's political rights, and improvement in women's education. Emma Willard and Mary Lyon pioneered in the higher education of women, while Yankees comprised most of the reformers who went South during Reconstruction in the late 1860s to educate the Freedmen.

Historian John Buenker has examined the worldview of the Yankee settlers in the Midwest:Because they arrived first and had a strong sense of community and mission, Yankees were able to transplant New England institutions, values, and mores, altered only by the conditions of frontier life.  They established a public culture that emphasized the work ethic, the sanctity of private property, individual responsibility, faith in residential and social mobility, practicality, piety, public order and decorum, reverence for public education, activists, honest, and frugal government, town meeting democracy, and he believed that there was a public interest that transcends particular and stock ambitions.  Regarding themselves as the elect and just in a world rife with sin and corruption, they felt a strong moral obligation to define and enforce standards of community and personal behavior….  This pietistic worldview was substantially shared by British, Scandinavian, Swiss, English-Canadian and Dutch Reformed immigrants, as well as by German Protestants and many of the Forty-Eighters.Yankees dominated New England, much of upstate New York, and much of the upper Midwest, and were the strongest supporters of the new Republican party in the 1860s. This was especially true for the Congregationalists, Presbyterians, and (after 1860) the Methodists among them. A study of 65 predominantly Yankee counties showed that they voted only 40% for the Whigs in 1848 and 1852, but became 61–65% Republican in presidential elections of 1856 through 1864.

Ivy League universities remained bastions of old Yankee culture until well after World War II, particularly Harvard and Yale, as well as "Little Ivy" liberal arts colleges.

Yankee stereotypes
President Calvin Coolidge exemplified the modern Yankee stereotype. Coolidge moved from rural Vermont to urban Massachusetts and was educated at elite Amherst College. Yet his flint-faced, unprepossessing ways and terse rural speech proved politically attractive. "That Yankee twang will be worth a hundred thousand votes", explained one Republican leader. Coolidge's laconic ways and dry humor were characteristic of stereotypical rural "Yankee humor" at the turn of the 20th century.

Contemporary uses

In the United States
The term Yankee can have many different meanings within the United States that are contextually and geographically dependent. Traditionally, Yankee was most often used to refer to a New Englander descended from the original settlers of the region, thus often suggesting Puritanism and thrifty values. By the mid-20th century, some speakers applied the word to any American inhabiting the area north of the Mason–Dixon Line, though usually with a specific focus still on New England. New England Yankee might be used to differentiate. However, within New England itself, the term still refers more specifically to old-stock New Englanders of English descent. For example:

In the Southern United States, the term is used in derisive reference to any Northerner, especially one who has migrated to the South and maintains derisive attitudes towards Southerners and the Southern way of life. Alabama lawyer and author Daniel Robinson Hundley in his book Social Relations in Our Southern States describes the Yankee as such: Yankee with all these is looked upon usually as a term of reproach --signifying a shrewd, sharp, chaffering, oily-tongued, soft-sawdering, inquisitive, money-making, money-saving, and money-worshipping individual, who hails from Down East, and who is presumed to have no where else on the Globe a permanent local habitation, however ubiquitous he may be in his travels and pursuits.Senator J. William Fulbright of Arkansas pointed out as late as 1966, "The very word 'Yankee' still wakens in Southern minds historical memories of defeat and humiliation, of the burning of Atlanta and Sherman's March to the Sea, or of an ancestral farmhouse burned by Quantrill's Raiders". Ambrose Bierce defines the term in The Devil's Dictionary as: "In Europe, an American. In the Northern States of our Union, a New Englander. In the Southern States the word is unknown. (See DAMNYANK.)"

E. B. White humorously draws his own distinctions:

Major League Baseball's New York Yankees acquired the name from journalists after the team moved from Baltimore in 1903, though they were officially known as the Highlanders until 1913. The regional Yankees–Red Sox rivalry can make the utterance of the term "Yankee" unwelcome to some fans in New England, especially to the most dedicated Red Sox fans living in the northeastern United States.

The term Swamp Yankee is sometimes used in rural Rhode Island, Connecticut, and southeastern Massachusetts to refer to Protestant farmers of moderate means and their descendants (in contrast to richer or urban Yankees); "swamp Yankee" is often regarded as a derogatory term. Scholars note that the famous Yankee "twang" survives mainly in the hill towns of interior New England, though it is disappearing even there.

Mark Twain's 1889 novel A Connecticut Yankee in King Arthur's Court popularized the word as a nickname for residents of Connecticut, and Connecticut Air National Guard unit 103d Airlift Wing is nicknamed "The Flying Yankees."Yankee White is an administrative nickname for a background check undertaken in the United States of America for Department of Defense personnel and contractor employees working with the president and vice president.

 In other countries 

The shortened form Yank is used as a derogatory, pejorative, playful, or colloquial term for Americans in Britain, Australia, Canada, South Africa, Ireland, and New Zealand. The full Yankee may be considered mildly derogatory, depending on the country.  The Spanish variation yanqui is sometimes used in Latin American contexts. Venezuelan Spanish has the word  derived c. 1940 around the oil industry from petty yankee or petit yanqui, a derogatory term for those who profess an exaggerated and often ridiculous admiration for anything from the United States.

In Australia, the term seppo is sometimes used as a pejorative reference to Americans. It derives from traditional rhyming slang where yank is replaced with septic tank and shortened to seppo.

In the late 19th century, the Japanese were called "the Yankees of the East" in praise of their industriousness and drive to modernization. In Japan, the term  has been used since the late 1970s to refer to a type of delinquent youth. In Finland, the word jenkki (yank) is sometimes used to refer to any American citizen, and Jenkkilä (Yankeeland) refers to the United States itself. It is not considered offensive or anti-American, but rather a colloquial expression. In Sweden, the word jänkare is a derivative of yankee that is used to refer to both American citizens and classic American cars from the 1950s that are popular in rural Sweden.

 See also 

 Dixie, a term used to refer to the Southern United States
 Brother Jonathan
 Carpetbagger, Northerners in the South during Reconstruction
 26th Maneuver Enhancement Brigade (Yankee Division)
 Jonkheer
 Anti-Americanism
 Yankee Doodle Dandy
 Yankee ingenuity
 Yanks Go Home, British sitcom
 Brit
 Canuck
 Aussie
 Kiwi
 Boer
 WASP

 References 
Notes

Further reading
 Beals, Carleton; Our Yankee Heritage: New England's Contribution to American Civilization (1955) online
 Conforti, Joseph A. Imagining New England: Explorations of Regional Identity from the Pilgrims to the Mid-Twentieth Century (2001) online
 Bushman, Richard L. From Puritan to Yankee: Character and the Social Order in Connecticut, 1690–1765 (1967)
 Daniels, Bruce C. New England Nation: The Country the Puritans Built (Palgrave Macmillan, 2012) 237 pp.  excerpt and text search
 Ellis, David M. "The Yankee Invasion of New York 1783–1850". New York History (1951) 32:1–17.
 Fischer, David Hackett. Albion's Seed: Four British Folkways in America (1989), Yankees comprise one of the four
 Gjerde; Jon. The Minds of the West: Ethnocultural Evolution in the Rural Middle West, 1830–1917 (1999) online
 Gray; Susan E. The Yankee West: Community Life on the Michigan Frontier (1996) online
 Handlin, Oscar. "Yankees", in Harvard Encyclopedia of American Ethnic Groups, ed. by Stephan Thernstrom, (1980) pp 1028–1030.
 Hill, Ralph Nading. Yankee Kingdom: Vermont and New Hampshire. (1960).
 Holbrook, Stewart H. Yankee Exodus: An Account of Migration from New England (1950)
 Holbrook, Stewart H.; Yankee Loggers: A Recollection of Woodsmen, Cooks, and River Drivers (1961)
 Hudson, John C. "Yankeeland in the Middle West",  Journal of Geography 85 (Sept 1986)
 Jensen, Richard. "Yankees" in Encyclopedia of Chicago (2005).
 Kleppner; Paul. The Third Electoral System 1853–1892: Parties, Voters, and Political Cultures University of North Carolina Press. 1979, on Yankee voting behavior
 Knights, Peter R.; Yankee Destinies: The Lives of Ordinary Nineteenth-Century Bostonians (1991) online
 Mathews, Lois K. The Expansion of New England (1909).
 Piersen, William Dillon. Black Yankees: The Development of an Afro-American Subculture in Eighteenth-Century New England (1988)
 Power, Richard Lyle. Planting Corn Belt Culture (1953), on Indiana
 Rose, Gregory. "Yankees/Yorkers", in Richard Sisson ed, The American Midwest: An Interpretive Encyclopedia (2006) 193–95, 714–5, 1094, 1194,
 Sedgwick, Ellery; The Atlantic Monthly, 1857–1909: Yankee Humanism at High Tide and Ebb (1994) online
 Smith, Bradford. Yankees in Paradise: The New England Impact on Hawaii (1956)
 Taylor, William R. Cavalier and Yankee: The Old South and American National Character (1979)
 WPA. Massachusetts: A Guide to Its Places and People. Federal Writers' Project of the Works Progress Administration of Massachusetts (1937).

Linguistic
 Davis, Harold. "On the Origin of Yankee Doodle", American Speech, Vol. 13, No. 2 (Apr., 1938), pp. 93–96 in JSTOR
 Fleser, Arthur F. "Coolidge's Delivery: Everybody Liked It." Southern Speech Journal 1966 32(2): 98–104. 
 Kretzschmar, William A. Handbook of the Linguistic Atlas of the Middle and South Atlantic States (1994)
 Lemay, J. A. Leo "The American Origins of Yankee Doodle", William and Mary Quarterly 33 (Jan 1976) 435–64 in JSTOR
 Logemay, Butsee H. "The Etymology of 'Yankee'", Studies in English Philology in Honor of Frederick Klaeber, (1929) pp 403–13.
 Mathews, Mitford M. A Dictionary of Americanisms on Historical Principles (1951) pp 1896 ff for elaborate detail
 Mencken, H. L. The American Language (1919, 1921)
 The Merriam-Webster new book of word histories (1991)
 Oxford English Dictionary Schell, Ruth. "Swamp Yankee", American Speech, 1963, Volume 38, No.2 pg. 121–123. in JSTOR
 Sonneck, Oscar G. Report on "the Star-Spangled Banner" "Hail Columbia" "America" "Yankee Doodle"'' (1909) pp 83ff online
 Stollznow, Karen. 2006. "Key Words in the Discourse of Discrimination: A Semantic Analysis. PhD Dissertation: University of New England., Chapter 5.

External links 

 Online Etymology Dictionary
 Wordorigins.org 

American culture
American regional nicknames
Anti-Americanism
English-American history
Ethnic and religious slurs
New England
Regional nicknames
English words